"Amusement Parks U.S.A." is a song written by Brian Wilson and Mike Love for the American rock band The Beach Boys. It was released on their 1965 album Summer Days (and Summer Nights!!). Produced by Wilson and featuring a lead vocal by Love, the song's lyrics describe "mess[ing] around at the [amusement] park all day." A short bridge section with session drummer Hal Blaine imitating a carnival barker is also featured, interpolating the spoken introduction to the Coasters' song "Little Egypt (Ying-Yang)".

The lyrics mention such amusement parks as Palisades Park in Cliffside Park, New Jersey; Salisbury Park in Salisbury, Massachusetts; Euclid Beach Park in Cleveland; Riverview Park in Chicago; and Disneyland and Pacific Ocean Park in the Los Angeles area. All but Disneyland and Steel Pier ceased operation within a few years of the song's release.

Alternate releases
"Amusement Parks U.S.A." was released as the B-side to "Salt Lake City" on a promotional single. It was also released as a single in Japan, backed with "The Rocking Surfer." The song was omitted from the 1980s re-release of Summer Days (and Summer Nights!!) (retitled California Girls), along with "I'm Bugged at My Ol' Man."

Critical opinion

AllMusic critic Richie Unterberger described the track as a "subpar effort" and as one of the "throwbacks to the empty-headed summer filler of previous days" on Summer Days (and Summer Nights!!). Author Jim Fuselli called the track a throwback "to the group's happy-go-lucky days," after also describing the album that it first appeared on as lacking "a coherent lyrical theme."

Personnel
Personnel sourced from Craig Slowinski.

The Beach Boys

Al Jardine – harmony and backing vocals
Mike Love – lead and bass vocals
Brian Wilson – lead, harmony, and backing vocals, grand piano, laughter
Carl Wilson – harmony and backing vocals
Dennis Wilson – harmony and backing vocals

Session musicians and production staff

References

1965 songs
The Beach Boys songs
Songs written by Brian Wilson
Songs written by Mike Love
Songs about the United States
Song recordings produced by Brian Wilson